The First Presbyterian Church of Hartford City is a Presbyterian church in Hartford City, Indiana, United States. The edifice is the oldest church building in a small city that at one time was a bustling community with as many as ten glass factories – and over 20 saloons.    Located at the corner of High and Franklin Streets, the church is part of the Hartford City Courthouse Square Historic District. The church was added to the National Register of Historic Places in 1986.

Construction of the house of worship began in 1892 and was completed in 1893. The church building is considered one of the city's best examples of the Richardsonian Romanesque style of architecture.  One aspect of the building that makes it particularly notable is its windows. The church features massive stained glass windows that were hand-crafted in Belgium and assembled by local glass workers originally from that country.

At the time the church was constructed, the region was undergoing substantial economic growth related to the discovery of natural gas, and this period is known as the Indiana Gas Boom. Most of the city's distinctive buildings within its Courthouse Square Historic District were built during that period, including both buildings listed in the National Register of Historic Places—the Blackford County Courthouse and the First Presbyterian Church.

Presbyterians in Hartford City
In the 1840s, the community that would eventually be named Hartford City was still named Hartford.  Methodists had been holding Christian religious services in the area since the 1830s. A second branch of Christianity came to the area on December 18, 1843, when the Presbyterian Church of Hartford was founded by a group of thirteen people and the Reverend Samuel N. Steel.  The community's original Presbyterian church building was built on the southeast edge of the village in 1844, and was located on Mulberry Street, between Water and Washington Streets.  Hartford was a small, unincorporated farming community at that time, and farm land was only two blocks away from the church. The church was renamed Blackford Presbyterian Church in 1853. That name was short-lived, as the church became known as the Presbyterian Church of Hartford (again) in 1855.

Today, the church's original Mulberry Street location is about two blocks from the current courthouse square of the city of Hartford City. Hartford was renamed Hartford City in the 1850s when it was discovered that a community named Hartford already existed in Indiana. The renamed community grew enough to incorporate as a town in 1857.  The Presbyterian congregation was also growing, although the church had yet to keep the same minister for more than three years.  Members of the church's congregation included “some of the county’s most respected citizens”, with surnames such as Willman, Gable, Reasoner, Fulton, Emshwiller, Woolard, Sanderson, and McEldowney.  (The area's first settler was Benjamin Reasoner).

As the house of worship became more crowded, the ladies of the congregation began a fund for a new church. On March 7, 1868, the Presbyterians purchased a lot on the north side of Hartford City at the corner of High and Franklin Streets, not far from the location of a Methodist church used in the 1840s. The lot cost $150. A new wood-frame Presbyterian Church was quickly constructed. Labor for construction was donated by the church members and friends. The new church was larger and better-furnished than the previous church, and was heated with two stoves. However, within the next two decades, overcrowding again became a problem. Members of the congregation were unwilling to go deep into debt for a new structure, but they began to work to acquire the financial resources necessary to achieve their goal of a larger house of worship.  
  
The women of the church's congregation again played a major role in fundraising for a new church building, with various projects and clubs. Among the fundraising groups were the Sewing Circle, the Reading Circle, and the Aftermath Society. In 1883, an additional group was established with the extensive name of "The Woman's Home and Foreign Missionary Society of Hartford City, Muncie Presbytery, Auxiliary to the Northwest Branches of the Presbyterian Church."  That organization, which started with 6 members, had as many as 80 members and guests at meetings within the year.  Putting 80 people in perspective, the whole town had a population of just 1,470 in 1880.

Construction

In 1890, Reverend A. Judson Arrick was installed as the new pastor of Hartford City's Presbyterian Church. At his urging, members worked even harder to raise funds for a new church building. Eventually, plans for the new building were submitted, and a contract was awarded to Alec Gable for the construction of a new brick building. In 1892, the wood-frame Presbyterian Church was moved one block east to Jefferson Street, enabling construction of a new house of worship to begin on the Franklin and High Street site. The cornerstone for the new building was laid during the same year, as construction began. Unfortunately, Reverend Arrick preached his last sermon in Hartford City on September 6, 1892, and was unable to see the completed church. In December, the roof was completed and floor laid, and church members held their first service in the partially completed structure on January 8, 1893. Reverend J. W. Fulton was the new pastor.

By July 1893, the new church building was completed. The well-attended Sunday dedication ceremony (July 9, 1893) included the Reverend Charles H. Payne, a noted New York divine, in addition to visitors from nearby cities and towns.   At the crowded dedication, it was announced that $5,000 would be needed to pay off all debt on the building. A total of $4,809 in donations was pledged at that time. Later that evening, additional funds were donated, and the grand total for the day was $5,529. Among the donors were five individuals that pledged $300 each, plus one group (Aftermath Society) also pledged $300. Thus, the church was free of debt.  The building was considered expensive for the time, costing over $10,000. However, the congregation's years of planning and generosity were rewarded with a debt-free structure that was considered a grand achievement. The church had two main rooms:  the sanctuary on the west side of the building, and an east-side lecture room.

The old wood-frame church was not abandoned. It was rented for a few years and used for storage. Sometime prior to 1895, it was deconstructed again – and moved to the south side of town. The wood-frame building served as the location for a mission Sunday School, and attendance averaged 30 to 40 students each Sunday.

Architecture

The citizens of the community were duly impressed with the new church. One of the local newspapers said "The edifice is one that does a credit to the city as well as the congregation...a monument of which they may be justly proud."  The church building is considered Hartford City's best example of a form of the Romanesque Revival architectural style known as Richardsonian Romanesque.  H. H. Richardson’s interpretation of the Romanesque architectural style became popular in America in the late 19th century, especially for churches and public buildings. Typical of his style was a large single tower, round arches above windows and doors, groups of windows, gabled roofs, and contrasting color or texture in exterior stone and brick masonry.

Alec Gable, the architect that designed Hartford City's First Presbyterian Church, incorporated many of these typical Richardson features in the church's blueprint.  The building's exterior is brick trimmed with limestone – a mixing of exterior textures typical of the Richardsonian Romanesque architectural style. Indiana is famous for its limestone, which has been used in monuments, universities, and government buildings found throughout the United States.  The church's main façade is gabled with a round-arched doorway and a large stained-glass window. A square bell tower, located on the northwest corner, divides the north and west sides of the building. The top of the tower is steep-pitched, pyramid-shaped, and crowned with a Christian cross. These are more characteristics typical of Richardson's designs. The corners of the tower form piers that rise above the base of the roof, and each pier has a circular cap that slopes to a ball-tipped point.

The west side of the structure (see photo herein), which houses the main (High Street) entrance to the sanctuary (located at the base of the bell tower), features an enormous stained glass window surrounded with narrow brick buttresses topped with limestone. Additional buttresses, similar in appearance but slightly lower in height, are located on both sides of the southwest corner of the building. The circular window, known as a rose window, is similar to the style of the circular windows found in European cathedrals. The Cathedral Basilica of St Denis and the Chartres Cathedral are examples of the rose window in Europe.

The original north (Franklin Street) side of the building (see photo herein) has two gabled sections. The section located next to the bell tower contains a large stained glass window exceeded in size only by the enormous window on the west side. Both of the large (west side and north side) windows are visible from inside the church's sanctuary. Another gabled section on the north side, further to the east from the tower, is the location for the Franklin Street entrance to the building – and more stained glass windows.

Stained glass

One of the main features of the 1893 version of the church building was (and still is) a huge stained glass window on the High Street (west) side of the sanctuary. Over fifty years after the window's installation, it was still believed to be the largest window enclosed in one frame in the state of Indiana.  The stained glass window was paid for by Mrs. George Gable as a memorial to her mother (Lydia Taughinbaugh), who was one of the charter members of the church.  The glass was handmade in Belgium, and installed by local glass workers originally from that country. Ironically, most of Hartford City's Belgian-immigrant glass workers were Catholics living on the other (south) side of the city.  Although Hartford City had numerous local glass factories by the next decade, Hartford City Glass Company was the only glass factory in town in 1892.  Therefore, it can safely be assumed that the Belgian glass workers were employees of that glass factory.   “Old-timers” may remember Belgian glass workers as employees of American Window Glass Company, which purchased Hartford City Glass just before 1900.
  
Belgium is the site of multiple examples of Western European cathedral architecture. Examples include the St. Michael and St. Gudula Cathedral, Cathedral of Our Lady, the Our Lady of Flanders’ Cathedral of Tournai, and others. During the 19th century, Belgium also contributed significantly to the revival of architecture from the Middle Ages. The works of countymen Jean-Baptiste Capronnier in stained glass, and Baron Bethune in architecture, are especially noteworthy.    An American example of Capronnier's work with stained glass can be found in the “parable window” in the First Presbyterian Church of Philadelphia.

Belgium was the world's top exporter of glass during the 19th century, and was considered one of the leading makers of flat glass.  Belgian craftsman, such as Fourcault and Bicheroux, continued the Belgian glassmaking excellence by making significant contributions to glassmaking processes during the beginning of the 20th century.  This technological advantage enabled Belgium to be the top exporter of plate and polished glass to the United States during the early 20th century before World War I.

The stained glass windows in Hartford City's Presbyterian Church still have exceptionally vivid colors, and these colors can be hard to duplicate. With the exception of the writings of the Monk Theopiles, the “recipes” for various colors of glass were often kept secret at the time the church's glass was created – there were no copyrights or patents.  Glass coloring knowledge was often passed on by word from master to apprentice. The exact shade of color of glass was dependent upon secret ingredients, the length of time the molten glass was in the “pot”, and even the composition of the pot.  Some of the ingredients used to color glass are no longer used because it was eventually discovered that the chemicals were hazardous to the glassmaker's health!  
    
During the Middle Ages, stained glass windows and other artwork were often used in churches to educate the illiterate.  Poor Man's Bible is the term that eventually was used to describe artwork used in this manner. Some windows used literal scenes from the Christian Bible, while other windows used symbolism to represent the Bible's teachings. The many stained glass windows in Hartford City's Presbyterian Church carry on this tradition with both Biblical scenes and symbolism.

At first glance, the huge window on the church's west wall (see High Street photo) appears to be an elaborate geometric design without obvious Christian symbols. Instead, the window is full of symbolism.  The circular portion at the top of the window is called a rose window. This type of stained glass window was popular in Romanesque and Gothic cathedrals. The west portico of the Tournai Cathedral is an example of a rose window in Belgium. The Notre Dame Cathedral in Paris, France, is another example of a cathedral with a rose window on the western facade. The west side location is typical for a rose window, and it enables the afternoon sunlight to enhance the beauty of the window for the viewer inside the structure.   During the 19th and 20th centuries, rose windows were often dedicated to the Virgin Mary, the mother of Jesus. The center of the rose window in Hartford City's First Presbyterian Church, with its gold ring, represents Christ as the center “light”.  “Christ” is surrounded by twelve objects – the twelve disciples. Below the rose are four lancets that represent the four gospel writers. This window, typically dedicated to the mother of Christ during the 19th century, is a memorial to its sponsor's mother – and follows tradition by its location on the western side of the church.

While the church's western window contains some feminine symbology – the other large window, located on the north side, is masculine with a crown symbolizing Jesus Christ the King. More examples of messages contained in the church's stained glass windows are listed below, and can be found in the various photos herein.

Most art (stained) glass rose windows in cathedrals and churches in the UK, Europe and the US, feature rich primary colors of deep blue, purple, red, green and gold. The art glass in the main west window in the sanctuary of First Presbyterian Church of Hartford City is unique in that it utilizes almost entirely pastel and muted colors to convey natural beauty and sacred meaning.

The various light blue tones portray the firmament, sky, air, containing moisture, rain, and water to replenish the earth.  The many muted greens represent the canopy of leaves overhead, chlorophyll, photosynthesis, the life cycle in nature, connecting to the firmament by the exchange of oxygen and carbon dioxide, and all organic life.  Although it may sound ambitious for craftsman of the nineteenth century, these representations are obvious in the windows when understood and looked for.

The many light blues and muted greens in the main west window represent the opening story in the book of Genesis: In the beginning God created the heavens and the earth: firmament, sky, natural processes of sunlight, air, and water nourishing the earth, soil, growing vegetation, the organic life cycle that sustains human life. There is both the what and the why of the art glass design – God created organic life in azures and olives, accented with mauves and teals and all manner of pastels.  And why?  God created organic life to sustain his most beloved creation, human life.

Acts 17: 22–31, the Apostle Paul addresses the intelligentsia of Athens gathered on Mars Hill across from the Parthenon on the Acropolis.  In the middle of his explanation refuting their many stone statues housing their many pagan gods, he says the true God cannot be contained in anything carved by human hands since the true God, ”gives to all people life and breath and all things;.” This short phrase may have been in the minds of the conceivers, designers, and makers of these art glass windows as evidenced by the “organic life and airy breath” portrayed by their beautiful and intricate design.

The Apostle Paul then explains the reason for life and breath, which is, “that they would seek God, if perhaps they might grope for Him and find Him, though He is not far from each one of us; for in Him we live and move and exist.” God gives natural life and life-giving breath so that we might find God, who lovingly gives life and meaning to human existence.

The final confirming evidence of this true meaning of the natural colors in the west window is in the north window. Clearly represented there is the natural beauty of the oceans covering nearly seventy percent of the surface of the earth whose process of evaporation and condensation are the source of all life in the firmament and on the earth.  Without the oceans, the rest of our earthly life cycle would not exist.  The north window confirms the west window.  Together these priceless, world-class art glass windows are the unique story of God-given science of nature enabling human endeavor to connect with the divine.

  A simple nativity of Jesus scene including the Star of Bethlehem.
  A crown of thorns with a broken cross symbolizing the crucifixion of Jesus.
  The traditional Holy Grail symbolizing communion.

Additions and enhancements

The new building renewed interest in the Presbyterian Church. Membership in 1895 grew to 253, and Sunday school enrollment was over 300.  Over the first one hundred years, minor changes were made to the church, including moving doorways and modifications to the sanctuary. For example, notice the door on the south side of the west wall on the right side of the pre-1910 picture herein (Construction section). A picture of the church from a publication dated 1895 also shows the south door.  The door no longer exists, as can be seen in the west wall (High Street side) picture from 2010 (Architecture section). The door must have been removed early in “life” of the building, since a postcard of the church dated circa 1910 also does not have the south door on the west wall.

One of the first modifications to the interior of the church was the enlargement of the pulpit and choir platform. This was done to accommodate a larger choir. The platform was enlarged again in 1912, when the church purchased a pipe organ.

During the 1920s, Sunday School attendance peaked at 500. Because of the larger number of attendees of the Sunday School classes, it was proposed to add a building to the east end of the church's property. However, concerns about debt caused that plan to be abandoned, and replaced with a lower-cost plan. The plan involved closing off the east lecture room, and was implemented in the early 1930s. The result was a balcony on the east side of the sanctuary and six class rooms. A few years later, in 1936, the sanctuary was completely redecorated.

The 1930s and 1940s marked some of the peak years of the church's attendance. Newer generations of the city's prominent names from the church's 19th century membership, such as Emshwiller, Fulton, Gable and Willman, continued to be part of the church's congregation. The congregation was also well represented in the city's important glass industry, with surnames such as Crimmel (Sneath Glass Company) and Fulton (Fulton Glass Company).   Membership during the 1940s was as high as 438.  The last major change to the church structure was made in 1959, when construction began for an east wing. Currently, the bell (see photo herein) from the bell tower rests on the ground on the south side of the building. The bell was removed from the tower because of safety concerns and to reduce strain on the tower structure.

Pipe organ

In 1908 the church received a new pastor, the Reverend George Sheldon. After a couple of years, Reverend Sheldon urged the congregation to secure a pipe organ. The various organizations of the church began raising funds. In addition, $1,000 was donated by Andrew Carnegie, who had retired from his many business enterprises and become a nationally known philanthropist. The new pipe organ cost over $2,000, and was installed in 1912 after the platform for the choir and pulpit was enlarged to accommodate the magnificent new instrument. The dedication recital was played by Professor Isaac Norris of DePauw University. The first regular organist was Professor Carl Bilby of Muncie, Indiana.  The pipe organ is thought to be the city's first, and is still used today.  The photo herein, from 2010, shows the church's pulpit and “pipe” portion of the pipe organ.  “Smaller” stained glass windows can be seen to the left near the choir loft. These windows were part of the eastern wall of the church before the addition of the East Wing.

East wing
A two-story flat-roofed structure was added to the east side of the church in 1960. The addition was named Westminster Fellowship Hall, and its purpose was for fellowship and Christian education. Planning and fund-raising began in the spring of 1958. This was the only large-scale expansion of the church, and construction began with a groundbreaking ceremony in August 1959. Dr. John W. Halsey, pastor of the church, and other members of the congregation took turns with a symbolic shoveling of the earth. The total cost of the expansion was approximately $85,000.

Present congregation
As of 2008, the church's congregation has 122 members.  The Reverend David Smith is the current (2010) pastor.  While the recent membership total reflects a decline from the pre-World War II peak years, it represents a small increase from earlier in the decade.  The city's population has declined since the 1970s, as the region has suffered from the effects of a troubled American auto industry. However, Hartford City's First Presbyterian Church is still “a monument of which they [the community] may be justly proud.”  The church conducts services in the city's historic district, in a historic building, located on land purchased in 1868. Situated at the corner of Franklin and High Streets, much of the church building looks the same as the outstanding structure constructed in 1892 and 1893. The edifice has existed in three different centuries – may it continue into a fourth.

See also
 Presbyterian Church (U.S.A.)

Notes

References

External links 

Joseph Wood Evans Memorial Special Collections and Archives Center - Presbyterian Archives Collections

Churches completed in 1893
Towers completed in 1893
National Register of Historic Places in Blackford County, Indiana
Churches on the National Register of Historic Places in Indiana
Bell towers in the United States
Presbyterian churches in Indiana
19th-century Presbyterian church buildings in the United States
Richardsonian Romanesque architecture in Indiana
Romanesque Revival church buildings in Indiana
Buildings and structures in Blackford County, Indiana